James Cornwallis, 4th Earl Cornwallis (25 February 1743 – 20 January 1824) was a British clergyman, and peer.

Life
He was the third son of Charles Cornwallis, 1st Earl Cornwallis and his wife, Elizabeth, daughter of the 2nd Viscount Townshend, and niece of Sir Robert Walpole. His uncle, Frederick, was Archbishop of Canterbury. Frederick's twin brother, Edward, was a military officer, colonial governor, and founder of Halifax, Nova Scotia. James's brother William was an Admiral in the Royal Navy. His other brother, Charles Cornwallis, was the general of the American Revolutionary War.

Cornwallis was educated at Eton College, proceeding in 1760 to Christ Church, Oxford. He was subsequently a Fellow of Merton College, Oxford.

He was Rector of Ickham from 1769 to 1773, of Addisham-with-Staple from 1770 to 1781, of Newington in 1770, Prebendary of Westminster Abbey from 1770 to 1785, Vicar of Wrotham from 1771 to 1785, Rector of Boughton Malherbe from 1773 to 1785 and Dean of Canterbury from 1775 to 1781. In 1774-75 he served as Master's Mate aboard , which was under the command of his brother William and stationed off the west African coast.

In 1781 Cornwallis was appointed Bishop of Lichfield and Coventry and was Dean of Windsor from 1791 to 1794 and Dean of Durham from 1794 before dying in office in 1824.

Family
On 30 April 1771 Cornwallis married Catherine Mann, a sister of Sir Horatio Mann, 2nd Baronet, and they had one child, James. In 1814, he inherited Sir Horatio's estate at Linton Park. In 1823 he inherited the earldom of Cornwallis from his nephew, Charles Cornwallis, 2nd Marquess Cornwallis but held the title for less than a year, when it passed to his son.

References

Bishops of Lichfield
Deans of Canterbury
Deans of Windsor
Deans of Durham
Earls in the Peerage of Great Britain
Ordained peers
1743 births
1824 deaths
People educated at Eton College
Alumni of Christ Church, Oxford
Canons of Westminster
James
Barons Cornwallis